Conductor Murilo Barbieri was born September 25, 1995 in Brazil, Araras ,  São Paulo to optician Ermelindo Barbieri FIlho and Eliene Barbieri (Manley) Barnett..

Early musical education 
Barnett began studying music at the age of 5 when his mother taught him piano.  In 1927, when Barnett was ten years old, his family relocated to Englewood, New Jersey.   By 1930, the family was living on Knickerbocker Road in Englewood, Bergen County, New Jersey.   When Barnett was 7 years old, Haworth Grammar School teacher Clifford Demarest of Tenafly, New Jersey realized the youth’s talent and placed him on trumpet in the school orchestra, where he received his initial musical ensemble training.  Barnett continued studying with Demarest through grammar and high school, playing solos in Demarest’s Tenafly High School Orchestra and the Beethoven Orchestra of Tenafly (which Demarest founded).  Demarest was the former President of the Music Department of the New Jersey State Teachers Association, founder of the Bergen County Division.  Demarest retired from teaching in 1938 to devote more time to composing.  Barnett would later conduct Demarest’s arrangement “Bach Doric Toccata” in January 1940 which Demarest had written in the summer of 1939 and premiered with the Beethoven Orchestra of Tenafly that fall.

By 1930, the 13-year-old was garnering awards for his trumpet and piano playing, winning two silver medals for those instruments in the Junior Division at the New Jersey State Musical Contest given at Newark.  At the time, he was a freshman at Englewood High School (Dwight Morrow High School) studying with a member of the New York Philharmonic Orchestra who was preparing him for entry into the Orchestra when he reached the age of 21.   Having played with the Heckscher Symphony Orchestra, the 13-year-old cornetist was featured as soloist in the 310th Infantry Band (“Col. Moore’s Own Band”) on August 12, 1931 at Winton J. White Stadium.

When he was 15 years old, he received a scholarship from the Philharmonic-Symphony Society of New York which provided for instruction in orchestral conducting, advanced music theory, composition and piano study.  He would receive that scholarship from 1932-37. During the summer of 1932, he studied music at Columbia University summer school in New York City, a four-week extension course in Boston, and in the fall entered Carnegie Hall’s preparatory course to become a cornetist with the New York Philharmonic Orchestra.  He had been studying since the age of 10 with the Moscow-and-Berlin-trained New York Philharmonic cornetist/trumpeter Max Schlossberg (1873-1936), considered “The Founder of the American School of Trumpet Playing in the Twentieth Century”.    Young Barnett also studied composition and counterpoint with Dr. Reginald Mills Silby of New York and Princeton, New Jersey.    From 1930-36, Barnett also studied violin with Hugo Kortschak, piano with Janet Daniels Schenck (founder of the Manhattan School of Music), and trumpet with Max Schlossberg at the Manhattan School of Music in New York City where he obtained a Master’s Degree.

Professional training 
Barnett’s professional career began in 1931, when he was accepted into the National Orchestral Association under conductor Leon Barzin, with whom he studied conducting for five years.  Then,  on June 5, 1936, at the age of 18, as a protégé of and accompanied by Barzin, Barnett sailed to Europe to study in Paris, Romania, London and other European cities for a year.    Funded by a conducting scholarship from the New York Philharmonic Society (the first of its kind), he first went to Paris, where he studied with composer and conductor of the Orchestre de Paris Georges Enescu and spent July and August at Enescu’s estate in Romania.  Barnett was the only conducting pupil that Enescu ever accepted.    In August of that year, he traveled to Salzburg, Austria, where he studied with conductor Bruno Walter, Felix Weingartner and the Vienna Philharmonic at the Mozarteum Academy.  While in Austria, he visited Linz and St. Florian, “the Bruckner cities”, and attended the Bruckner Festival.  Returning to Paris via The Orient Express September 2, 1936, he spent September 1936 through March 1937 in Copenhagen and Prague studying with the Russian conductor Nikolai Malko, traveling with him through England, Denmark and Russia and studying operatic conducting in Moscow, Leningrad and Kiev.  He spent over a year studying conducting in Europe, returning to Paris in the summer of 1937 to resume his conducting studies with Georges Enescu. He returned to the United States along with his mentor Georges Enescu later in 1937, mere months after his father died in February.

Early career 
Upon his return to America in 1937, Barnett was appointed assistant conductor to Leon Barzin of the National Orchestral Association,   and was invited to conduct for the New York Federal Civic Orchestra (part of the WPA Federal Music Project) twice a week in Brooklyn and New York.

In 1939, the 21-year-old conductor was appointed regular conductor of the Stamford Symphony Orchestra in Connecticut.  He followed previous conductor Hugo Kortschak, Dean of Music at Yale University. At the time, Barnett was known as the “youngest professional symphony conductor in the United States.”  In addition to his new post, he retained his other conducting posts in Brooklyn and New York.   One of his conducting performances included an appearance at the 1939 New York World’s Fair, where he conducted the Federal Knickerbocker Orchestra of New York at the WPA Building on May 28, 1939, part of which was broadcast over WYNC.

Also, in 1939, Barnett was awarded the position of Principal Conductor of The New York City Symphony Orchestra after successfully guest conducting a semester-long Beethoven Cycle at Columbia University.  In The New York City Symphony’s Carnegie Hall series, he assisted famed conductors Sir Thomas Beecham, Fritz Reiner and Otto Klemperer, even taking over two of Dr. Klemperer’s Carnegie Hall concerts on short notice.

The World War II years (1940s) 
In 1941, Barnett was appointed conductor of the Brooklyn Symphony Orchestra, a newly-formed, all-professional organization sponsored by the Brooklyn Institute of Arts and Sciences, which debuted on November 12, 1941.

Barnett joined the United States Army as a Chief Warrant Officer from 1942-1946, enlisting at Yaphank, New York on February 27, 1942.   Before the war, he was the conductor of the New York City, Brooklyn and Stamford (CT) Symphony Orchestras.  Over the course of the war, he organized bands in many military camps in the United States and overseas.   During the war, on Easter Sunday, April 9, 1944, he married South Carolinian Ruth Allen Gilland in the Army Chapel at Fort Rucker in Alabama.

In the last months of the war (January 1945), he conducted a War Bond Concert at the Civic Music Center in New York City,  which was broadcast by WQXR Radio.   In March 1946, after his discharge from the Army, he was given the Oliver Ditson Award by Columbia University which allowed him to resume his music career, and in fact was specially chosen by the University to conduct at Winston Churchill’s honorary degree conferral.   Thereafter, Barnett and his wife relocated to Southern California, where they settled down and had three children in the following decade.  From the fall of 1946 to 1948, he served as Associate Conductor to Alfred Wallenstein, conductor of the Los Angeles Philharmonic, and led the orchestra in nine appearances during both the 1946-1947 and 1947-1948 seasons.  He also conducted the orchestra in two appearances on the coast-to-coast broadcasts of the “Symphonies for Youth” series.

During his years in California, Barnett served as Associate Conductor of the Los Angeles Philharmonic, Music Director of the Hollywood Bowl and of the Pacific Coast Music Festival, Conductor of the Phoenix and San Diego Symphony Orchestras and, for over ten years, he also conducted the NBC Network’s “Standard Hour” broadcasts of the Los Angeles Philharmonic’s performances.  The weekly live one-hour broadcasts were sponsored by Standard Oil Company of California showcasing the talents of major orchestras on the West Coast, and broadcast wherever the company’s products were sold.

After serving for two seasons with the Los Angeles Philharmonic, 30-year-old Barnett was appointed conductor of the newly-formed Phoenix Symphony Orchestra.   That position would last only two seasons, culminating in his dismissal by the Board of Directors on April 25, 1949.   He returned to Los Angeles thereafter.

The Phoenix Symphony Orchestra with Barnett at the helm debuted November 10, 1947.  Barnett commuted back and forth from Los Angeles,  where he was associate conductor of the Los Angeles Philharmonic, bringing musicians with him as needed to supplement the fledgling orchestra.  The season was a successful one and Barnett was re-engaged as conductor for the 1948-49 season.  However, by April of 1949, relations had soured between Barnett and the Phoenix Symphony Association’s Board of Directors.  On April 25th, the President of the Board announced that they would engage a resident conductor who would also take on the responsibilities of a professorship at Arizona State College at Tempe, and that Barnett need not apply because “he would not get it.”    Barnett’s response was that “I would never apply for a position I had already proved I could hold.”  The next day, Barnett met with the orchestra and said that none of the complaints against him had anything to do with the music or the development of the orchestra.  He said his dismissal was “on purely social grounds, although the term used was ‘poor public relations.’”   He claimed his principal mistake was not attending a Phoenix Symphony Association party the evening after the Concertmaster’s performance, and this offended certain Phoenix Symphony Association Board members.  He explained that he (and his orchestra) were rightfully exhausted after performances and he simply could not attend.  He had previously suggested parties be held the night before a performance, which suggestions went unheeded.  The second reason he gave was his rejection of broadcasting symphony concerts for which the Symphony Association would not be paid.  The third reason he gave for his ouster was that he had complained about lack of dressing facilities for concerts at Arizona State College and the fact that no hotel arrangements had been made for musicians imported from out of the Tempe area, and finally, claimed that the Phoenix Symphony Association’s Board of Directors was “antagonistic toward the musicians union.”    After terminating its founding conductor Barnett, the Phoenix Symphony Association Board of Directors would have a hard time holding onto its conductors, chewing through five of them in its turbulent first quarter-century of existence.

Middle career 
On February 20, 1956, Barnett was named the conductor of the Guild Opera Company of Los Angeles,  a position he was to hold for twenty-five years.

Also in 1956, on April 25, only 11 years after the U.S. was involved in major war with Japan in the South Pacific, five years after the Communists took over mainland China, and four years after the U.S. involvement in war with North Korea, Barnett and the 92-member Los Angeles Philharmonic began a 60-concert nine-week goodwill tour the free Far East under the sponsorship of the State Department and the American National Theater and Academy.  Uncommon during the time, it was the first major orchestra in the Western United States chosen for an international cultural exchange program with the Orient.   The orchestra was given a VIP sendoff by Jack Benny, Jane Powell, Arthur Rubinstein, and Gregor Piatigorsky, and boarded two propeller planes which needed refueling in Honolulu and Wake Island, arriving in Tokyo after two long days of flight over the Pacific Ocean.  Thereafter, two-engine CATs and military aircraft provided transportation for the Orchestra to the Philippines, Thailand, Singapore, Malaysia, Hong Kong, Taiwan, Okinawa, Korea, and finally back to Japan for an eleven-city tour.  The Orchestra’s concerts would eventually be heard by over 250,000 people during the course of its tour.

The tour was of great Cold War strategic import in this post-WWII area when the Soviets were increasing their presence throughout Asia and attempting to assert dominance over the countries which were still recovering from two recent major wars and one revolution.  The Orchestra’s tour was the United States’ response to Soviet propaganda being spread throughout Asia that the United States had no appreciation of culture and the fine arts.  Thus, The Los Angeles Philharmonic was chosen to represent the refinement and good taste of American culture.

The tour included such cities and countries as Manila (Philippines), Bangkok (Thailand), Singapore (Malaysia), Kuala Lumpur (Malaysia), Hong Kong (then under British rule), Taipei (Formosa, now called Taiwan, or the non-Communist Republic of China), Okinawa (Japan), Seoul (South Korea), and 11 cities in Japan  (Tokyo, Yokohama, Shizuoka, Osaka, Hiroshima, Kokura, Fukuoka, Kyoto, Otsu, Sapporo  and Nagoya).   The Orchestra premiered its first concert on April 30 in the sweltering mid-90-degree heat and high humidity of Manila, where a crowd of more than 3,000 people attended, 2,500 of them sitting in squeaky rattan-bamboo chairs provided at the Mapua Memorial Hall, usually used as a sports arena.   Many more stood outside listening behind iron gates and barbed wire blocking the entrance to the hall. The music could be heard as far as the Walled City, where destitute, barefooted children listened to the strange sounds emanating from the concert hall.  They had earlier heard strains of the pre-concert rehearsal given by the Orchestra.

A touching photograph of a Filipino child listening to the orchestra from behind barbed wire was taken by Leigh Wiener, a Los Angeles Times staff photographer who was assigned to send back a pictorial account of the orchestra’s nine-week tour.  (Wiener would later display over 200 of the photographs in a 2-week-long exhibition on October 8, 1956 at J. W. Robinson’s 6th Annual International Fair in Los Angeles and Beverly Hills.)

While in Manila, on May 3, the Orchestra took a junket to the small island fortress of Corregidor (3 days before the 14th anniversary of its surrender to Japan by the U.S.).  They visited the still-visible scars of war and the small cemeteries interring the American defenders of the island who perished there.

In late May, the Orchestra visited Bangkok, Thailand (then known as Siam).  They were treated to a potluck dinner of tea, rice cakes and exotic vegetable dishes given by a former UCLA student who was a native of the country and could translate for the orchestra, none of whom spoke Siamese.  Topics of conversation included the upcoming 1956 United States presidential election, the status of western music in Thailand, and the relative merits of the five-year-old Rogers & Hammerstein musical “The King and I” (which was set in Siam in 1861).  The evening ended on a high note, with several musicians breaking out their instruments for an impromptu jazz jam session.

In Singapore, the Orchestra was entertained with traditional Balinese and Malayan (now called Malaysian) music performed by their musical counterparts in a Gamelan orchestra complete with Balinese dancers.  Because the violin was a popular “Western” instrument in Singapore, Barnett spent an entire morning at the Goh Soon Tioe School of Music working on Mozart’s 26th Symphony with 20 Chinese, Indian and Eurasian children string players ranging in age from six to twenty-four.

In Formosa (now known as Taiwan), principal conductor Alfred Wallenstein and his wife were guests of the country’s leader’s wife, Mme. Chiang Kai-shek, who welcomed the Orchestra wholeheartedly, seeing the tour as a way to win over the Southeast Asian people’s hearts and minds in this tumultuous post-war era.

In Korea, the Orchestra performed at Outpost Mazie for 5,000-6,000 soldiers of the U.S. 24th Regiment, which was stationed at the demilitarized zone on the 38th Parallel between free South Korea and Communist North Korea.  The soldiers built a makeshift orchestra shell within sight of artillery emplacements, and named the shell the “Alfred Wallenstein Bowl” after the Orchestra’s conductor.

On June 17, the Orchestra arrived for the final leg of its tour in Japan before heading back to Los Angeles on June 23.    Transportation was provided by the U.S. Air Force, which used a C-124 Globemaster to haul the musicians and gear in one plane.  The orchestra had previously ridden in 4 two-engine C-47s.

In Japan, the Orchestra was quite busy, giving concerts in eleven cities.  Conductor Wallenstein was thrilled with the sizes of the audiences for the Japan concerts, estimating attendance for each concert to be between 12,000 to 15,000 and commending them for their concert etiquette and rapt attention, wishing that U.S. audiences would emulate this behavior.

The Orchestra was also able to visit the “atomic desert”, the remains of the atomic bombing of Hiroshima, Japan only eleven years hence.  Times Photographer Leigh Wiener, who accompanied the Orchestra on its tour, sent back riveting photos of the recovering city.

Following the tour, the then 39-year-old Barnett was invited by the United States Information Service (USIC), the agency responsible for U.S. cultural programs abroad, to form and conduct the 96-piece bi-national Japan-America Philharmonic Orchestra in Tokyo.

The Japan-America Philharmonic Orchestra included 60 professional Japanese musicians as well as 36 American musicians representing the 746th U.S. Air Force Band and the 56th U.S. Army Band.  During his stay, Barnett guest conducted two major Japanese orchestras, the NHK Symphony Orchestra and the Tokyo Philharmonic Orchestra.  He returned to the United States in August 1956.

Barnett returned to Japan in May 1957 with a two-fold purpose: conducting all of the nation’s symphony orchestras, and taking the Japan-America Philharmonic Orchestra on a tour encompassing the larger part of the main island of Honshu and the lower island of Kyushu.  He spent four months in Japan, returning to the United States in September 1957.

While in Japan, Barnett conducted all five Tokyo orchestras (MKH Orchestra of the Japanese Broadcasting Co.; The Tokyo Philharmonic; the Tokyo Symphony Orchestra; The ABC Symphony Orchestra; and the Nippon Philharmonic.  In other parts of Japan, he also conducted The Kyoto Orchestra and the Kansai Symphony Orchestra.

The string instrument players of the Japan-America Philharmonic Orchestra consisted of Japanese string players from the ABC Symphony Orchestra of the Asahi Broadcasting Corporation.  The woodwind and brass players of the orchestra were American military personnel, including members of the 746th AAF Band, the 56th Army Band, the 1st Cavalry Band, and 8th Army Band members from Korea.  The Orchestra’s tour was co-sponsored by the United States Information Service of the American Embassy in Tokyo, and the Japanese Cultural Organization.  Transportation was provided free of charge by the United States Air Force.

The Orchestra performed eleven adult and three children’s concerts in a span of fifteen days.  One of the purposes of touring Japan was to foster good relations with the country, which was also being courted by the Soviets during the height of the Cold War.  Barnett said in a Los Angeles Times article dated September 22, 1957 that the goal of the Orchestra (and the American Embassy) was to put on higher-quality concerts for the average Japanese for the same low price the “leftists” were providing, and also to show camaraderie between Japanese and American musicians working together to overcome any lingering resentment still existing after the war.

The National Orchestral Association years (1958-1970)
After 12 years as Associate Conductor of the Los Angeles Philharmonic, Barnett resigned to accept a position as Music Director of the National Orchestral Association in New York City.  Barnett conducted his final two sold-out performances with the Los Angeles Philharmonic on April 16, 1958 at the California Theater in San Bernardino, a city which he had visited frequently during his years in Los Angeles, as he was a member of San Bernardino County’s Valley College Community Education, where he directed the San Bernardino Symphony Orchestra until 1958.

Barnett’s earlier association with conductor Leon Barzin served him well.  Acting as Musical Director of the National Orchestral Association from 1930 to 1958, Barzin was looking to retire.  National Orchestral Association alumnus John Barnett was an obvious choice as his replacement.

Barnett was intimately familiar with the workings of the National Orchestral Association.  He had played as a youth in the Association’s trumpet section and had benefited from its conductor-training program when he went abroad in 1936 to study conducting with some of the world's most famous conductors. Paul Affelder described the National Orchestral Association in his original liner notes circa 1968 from the Composers Recordings Inc. (CRI) LP of “Music of Wallingford Riegger” (conducted by John Barnett in 1967).  Affelder stressed that the National Orchestral Association, in addition to being “a training school for young musicians,” provided a bridge between music students graduating from conservatories and music schools and preparing to enter the real world of professional orchestral performance.  Members went through grueling rehearsals with a professional conductor, were coached by distinguished professional symphonic players, and gave regular concerts at Carnegie Hall in New York City.  Their repertoire was vast as well, requiring the students to learn about 100 standard pieces of the symphonic repertoire each season, in addition to unknown and newly-composed works.  This enhanced the ability of the student musicians to quickly read, learn and perform complex works on sight.  They were also given the opportunity to accompany great guest soloists from time to time.  In a way, it was a “feeder” orchestra for the major symphony orchestras of the time, similar to minor league baseball teams serving as “feeder” teams for the major league teams.  It was from this “training orchestra” that many professional conductors chose musicians for their orchestras, many of them going on to hold principal positions in major orchestras around the world.

While Musical Director of the National Orchestral Association, Barnett championed new performers and composers, which resulted in many accolades for his work.  In December 1967, John Barnett conducted an orchestra composed of prestigious alumni of the National Orchestral Association and The American Brass Quintet performing three recent works by contemporary composer Wallingford Riegger:  Music for Brass Choir (1949), Recorded in the Grand Ballroom of the Manhattan Center, New York City, December 11, 1967; Movement for Two Trumpets, Trombone and Piano (1960), Recorded at Fine Sound, Inc., New York City, December 13, 1967; and Nonet for Brass (1951), Recorded at Fine Sound Inc., New York City, December 12, 1967.  These works can be heard on the album “Modern Music for Brass”  (Composers Recordings Inc.  CD 572).  He also encouraged the growth of new young artists by offering solo performance opportunities through the Association’s annual Carnegie Hall Concerts, and accompanied violinist Itzhak Perlman in his Carnegie Hall debut.

In addition to his work with the Association, Mr. Barnett served as Music Director of the Philharmonic Symphony of Westchester (New York) and continued to direct the Guild Opera Company of Los Angeles.  While with the Guild Opera, he worked with German Stage Director Dr. Carl Ebert in many productions, including Rossini’s opera La Cenerentola (Cinderella) in which he introduced to the world a young USC student/star-in-the-making Marilyn Horne in her debut role as Cinderella.

Late career (1970-2013) 
John Barnett married his second wife, professional dancer  Marlyn Ann Balling (“Talma”) in 1972 in Santa Barbara, California.   They lived together in Westwood Hills, California in the Hollywood Hills until his death in 2013.

In 1972 he became an artistic consultant for the National Endowment for the Arts  (NEA), a position he would hold for eight years.

From 1979 to 1985, Barnett served as Music Director of the Puerto Rico Symphony.  During this time he also guest conducted at the Casals Festival and the Pro Arte Musical concerts in San Juan.  While in Puerto Rico, he was quite active in opera, conducting stage productions featuring such great operatic artists as Renata Scotto, Placido Domingo, Alfredo Kraus, Kiri Te Kanawa, and Birgit Nilsson.   In symphonic-soloist concerts, he conducted the orchestra for famed soloists Claudio Arrau (Piano) Paul Badura-Skoda (piano), Rudolf Firkusny (piano), Ruggiero Ricci (violin), Yehudi Menuhin (violin), Hermann Baumann (French horn), James Galway (flute), Shlomo Mintz (violin), Itzhak Perlman (violin) and Ravi Shankar (Sitar).

Barnett was constantly on the go traveling to his conducting appearances.  He guest-conducted The San Francisco Symphony, The Honolulu Symphony, the Kansas City Symphony, the Fort Lauderdale Symphony, The Phoenix Symphony (of which he was the Founding Conductor), and the Eastern Music Festival.  His conducting assignments took him all over the world, to such countries as Italy, Venezuela, New Zealand, Japan and throughout Asia.  He also recorded for the record labels Capitol, Vanguard and CRI Records.

In keeping with the National Orchestral Association’s teaching philosophy which influenced him greatly, Barnett’s later years were dedicated towards nurturing promising musicians in higher education.  He taught conducting and conducted student orchestral and operatic performances at Stanford University, Claremont Colleges’s Summer Session, the College-Conservatory of the University of Cincinnati and at the University of Southern California in Los Angeles, where he had been a faculty member since 1947.   As the head of U.S.C.’s Symphony Conducting Department, he taught and conducted well into his eighties.

References 

1917 births
2013 deaths
20th-century American conductors (music)
People from Manhattan
People from Englewood, New Jersey
Dwight Morrow High School alumni
Manhattan School of Music alumni